Thomas Sebora Koroma (born 10 January 1993) is a Sierra Leonean footballer who plays as forward for Negeri Sembilan.

References

External links
 
 

1993 births
Living people
Sierra Leonean footballers
Sierra Leone international footballers
Negeri Sembilan FA players
Expatriate footballers in Malaysia
Sierra Leonean expatriate sportspeople in Malaysia
Sierra Leonean expatriate footballers
Association football forwards
Sportspeople from Freetown